Judith Hudson (born 20 April 1958) is an Australian former swimmer. She competed at the 1972 Summer Olympics and the 1976 Summer Olympics.

References

External links
 

1958 births
Living people
Australian female breaststroke swimmers
Australian female butterfly swimmers
Australian female medley swimmers
Olympic swimmers of Australia
Swimmers at the 1972 Summer Olympics
Swimmers at the 1976 Summer Olympics
Place of birth missing (living people)
20th-century Australian women